High five is a friendly gesture in which one individual slaps another's hand.

High five (and variants such as Hi5, Hi-5, and Hi-Five) may also refer to:

Music
 Hi-5 (Australian group), an Australian children's musical group
 Hi-5 (Greek band), a Greek all-girl pop group
 Hi-5 (South African band), a South African boy band
 Hi-Five, a rhythm and blues quintet from Waco, Texas
Hi-Five (album)
 The Hi-Fives, a rock and roll band from San Francisco, California
 Hi-Five (Israeli band), a 1990s Israeli boy band
 Jim Lowe and the High Fives, 1950s band
 High Five (album), by Teen Top
 "Hi-Five" (song), a song by Superfly
 "High Five" (Yuma Nakayama song), 2014
 "High 5 (Rock the Catskills)", a song by Beck from Odelay

Television
 Hi-5 (American TV series), the television series starring the American group
 Hi-5 (Australian TV series), the television series starring the Australian group
 Hi-5 (British TV series), the television series starring the British group
 Hi-5 Philippines, the television series starring the Philippines group
 "High Five" (Power Rangers), an episode of Mighty Morphin Power Rangers

Other uses
 High Five (Columbus), a business district in Columbus, Ohio
 High Five Interchange, a Dallas freeway interchange
 High 5s Project, an international collaboration promoting patient safety activities 
 hi5, a social networking website
 Highfive (company), an American video conferencing company
 High 5 Tickets to the Arts, New York non-profit for students
 HIV (slang reference)
 High Five cells, a strain of insect cells
 High Five (novel), a novel by Janet Evanovich
 High Fives Gang, 1890s outlaws
 HiFive, a series of single board computers.
 High Five is another name for Cinch (card game)
 'Hi Five', a 1950's compact, containing 'Misty Amber' face powder, by Max Factor